Jalalpur is a constituency of the Uttar Pradesh Legislative Assembly covering the city of Jalalpur in the Ambedkar Nagar district of Uttar Pradesh, India.

Jalalpur is one of five assembly constituencies in the Ambedkar Nagar Lok Sabha constituency. Since 2008, this assembly constituency is numbered 280 amongst 403 constituencies.

Members of Legislative Assembly

Election results

2022

2019 Bypoll

2017
Ritesh Pandey won in last Assembly election of 2017 Uttar Pradesh Legislative Elections defeating Bharatiya Janta Party candidate Rajesh Singh by a margin of 13,030 votes.

References

External links
 

Assembly constituencies of Uttar Pradesh
Ambedkar Nagar district